In the United States, government shutdowns occur when there is a failure to enact funding legislation to finance the government for its next fiscal year or a temporary funding measure. Ever since a 1980 interpretation of the 1884 Antideficiency Act, a "lapse of appropriation" due to a political impasse on proposed appropriation bills requires that the US federal government curtail agency activities and services, close down non-essential operations, furlough non-essential workers, and only retain essential employees in departments covering the safety of human life or protection of property. Voluntary services may only be accepted when required for the safety of life or property.  Shutdowns can also occur within and disrupt state, territorial, and local levels of government.

Since the enactment of the US government's current budget and appropriations process in 1976, there have been a total of 22 funding gaps in the federal budget, ten of which have led to federal employees being furloughed.  Prior to 1980, funding gaps did not lead to government shutdowns, until Attorney General Benjamin Civiletti issued a legal opinion requiring the government to be shut down when a funding gap occurs.  This opinion was not consistently adhered to through the 1980s, but since 1990 all funding gaps lasting longer than a few hours have led to a shutdown.

Some of the most significant shutdowns in U.S. history have included the 21-day shutdown of 1995–1996 during the Bill Clinton administration over opposition to major spending cuts; the 16-day shutdown in 2013 during the Barack Obama administration caused by a dispute over implementation of the Affordable Care Act (ACA); and the 35-day shutdown of 2018–2019 during the Donald Trump administration, the longest shutdown in US history, caused by a dispute over the funding amount for an expansion of the U.S.–Mexico border barrier.

Shutdowns cause the disruption of government services and programs, including the closure of national parks and institutions (in particular, due to shortages of federal employees).  A major loss of government revenue comes from lost labor from furloughed employees who are still paid, as well as loss of fees that would have been paid during the shutdown.  Shutdowns also cause a significant reduction in economic growth (depending on the length of the shutdown). During the 2013 shutdown, Standard & Poor's, the financial ratings agency, stated on October 16 that the shutdown had "to date taken $24 billion out of the economy", and "shaved at least 0.6 percent off annualized fourth-quarter 2013 GDP growth".

Federal government

Overview 
Under the separation of powers created by the United States Constitution, the appropriation and control of government funds for the United States is the sole responsibility of the United States Congress. Congress begins this process through proposing an appropriation bill aimed at determining the levels of spending for each federal department and government program. The finalized version of the bill is then voted upon by both the House of Representatives and the Senate. After it passes both chambers, it proceeds to the President of the United States to sign the bill into law.

Government shutdowns tend to occur when there is a disagreement over budget allocations before the existing cycle ends. Such disagreements can come from the president – through vetoing any finalized appropriation bills they receive – or from one or both chambers of Congress, often from the political party that has control over that chamber. A shutdown can be temporarily avoided through the enactment of a continuing resolution (CR), which can extend funding for the government for a set period, during which time negotiations can be made to supply an appropriation bill that all involved parties of the political deadlock on spending can agree upon. However, a CR can be blocked by the same parties if there are issues with the content of the resolution bill that either party has a disagreement upon, in which case a shutdown will inevitably occur if a CR cannot be passed by the House, Senate or president. Congress may, in rare cases attempt to override a presidential veto of an appropriation bill or CR, but such an act requires there to be majority support of two-thirds of both chambers.

Initially, many federal agencies continued to operate during shutdowns, while minimizing all nonessential operations and obligations, believing that Congress did not intend that agencies close down while waiting for the enactment of annual appropriations acts or temporary appropriations. However, Attorney General Benjamin Civiletti issued two opinions in 1980 and 1981, that more strictly interpreted the Antideficiency Act in the context of a funding gap, along with its exceptions. The opinions stated that, with some exceptions, the head of an agency could avoid violating the Act only by suspending the agency's operations until the enactment of an appropriation. In the absence of appropriations, exceptions would be allowed only when there is some reasonable and articulable connection between the function to be performed and the safety of human life or the protection of property. However, even after the Civiletti opinions, not all funding gaps led to shutdowns. Of the nine funding gaps between 1980 and 1990, only four led to furloughs.

Shutdowns of the type experienced by the United States are nearly impossible in other forms of government:

 Under the parliamentary systems used in most European and Asian nations, stalemates within the government are much less likely, as the executive head of government (i.e. the prime minister) must be a member of the legislature majority, and must maintain the approval of the legislature to remain in power (confidence and supply).  Typically a legislature is suspended if a budget fails to pass (loss of supply), and the head of government must resign. Then the head of state may either appoint another member of legislature who can garner majority support, or dissolve the legislature and conduct fresh general elections.
 In other presidential systems, the executive branch typically has the authority to keep the government functioning even without an approved budget.

Effects 

While government shutdowns prior to the 1995–1996 shutdowns had very mild effects, a full federal government shutdown causes a large number of civilian federal employees to be furloughed. During a government shutdown, furloughed government employees are prohibited from even checking their e-mail from home. To enforce this prohibition, many agencies require employees to return their government-issued electronic devices for the duration of the shutdown.

Because of the size of the government workforce, the effects of a shutdown can be seen in macroeconomic data. For example, with payment delayed to 1.3 million workers, and 800,000 employees locked out, confidence in the job market decreased but recovered within a month of the 2013 shutdown, and GDP growth slowed 0.1–0.2%. Still, the loss of GDP from a shutdown is a bigger sum than it would cost to keep the government open.

However, the complete effects of a shutdown are often clouded by missing data that cannot be collected while specific government offices are closed.

Additionally, some effects of the shutdown are difficult to directly measure, and are thought to cause residual impacts in the months following a shutdown. Some examples include destroyed scientific studies, lack of investment, and deferred maintenance costs. The length of the 2018–2019 shutdown curtailed safety and law enforcement investigations, caused air travel delays as essential workers stopped showing up, shut down some facilities for Native Americans and tourists, and delayed regulatory approvals and immigration hearings for non-detainees.

The exact details of which government functions stop during a shutdown is determined by the Office of Management and Budget.

What stays open 

 "Emergency personnel" continue to be employed, including the active duty (Title 10) military, federal law enforcement agents, doctors and nurses working in federal hospitals, and air traffic controllers.
 Members of Congress continue to be paid, because their pay cannot be altered except by direct law.
 Mail delivery is not affected as it is self-funded and the funds are not appropriated by Congress.
 Sometimes the Washington, D.C. municipal government remains open. For example, during the 2013 shutdown, the city remained open because mayor Vincent C. Gray declared the entire municipal government to be essential.

What is shut down 

 For the Department of Defense, at least half of the civilian workforce, and the full-time, dual-status military technicians in the US National Guard and traditional Guardsmen (those on Title 32 status) are furloughed and not paid while the shutdown is in effect.
 Programs that are funded by laws other than annual appropriations acts (like Social Security) may also be affected by a funding gap, if program execution relies on activities that receive annually appropriated funding.
 Sometimes parts of the Washington, D.C. municipal government shut down, closing schools and suspending utilities such as garbage collection.

Arguments for and against 

During the 2013 shutdown, the moral philosopher Peter Singer argued in Slate, that shutdowns were evidence that the U.S. Constitution's separation of powers constituted "a fundamental flaw."

In 2019, following the end of the 2018–19 shutdown, Michael Shindler argued in The American Conservative that shutdowns protect popular sovereignty. He writes, "No other political phenomena so forcefully and dramatically obliges the whole people to recognize that their ideological divisions have become so great that the exercise of their sovereignty has become virtually impossible," and "During a shutdown, the government, which is bound by elaborate mechanisms to the national will, becomes confused. For a moment, it seems as if the march of American history is at a standstill. There are only two means of moving forward: either government officials follow the will of something other than the nation or the nation engages in a momentous reconciliation of its will."

List of federal shutdowns 

This list includes only major funding gaps which led to actual employee furloughs within federal departments of the US government. It does not include funding gaps that did not involve shutdowns of government departments, in which examples include: a brief funding gap in 1982, in which nonessential workers were told to report to work but to cancel meetings and not perform their ordinary duties; a three-day funding gap in November 1983 that did not disrupt government services; and a 9-hour funding gap in February 2018 that did not disrupt government services.

1980 

On 1 May 1980, during the presidential term of Jimmy Carter, the Federal Trade Commission (FTC) was shut down for one day after Congress failed to pass an appropriations bill for the agency, due to differing opinions towards its oversight of the US economy. Prior to the shutdown, a review had been made of the 1884 Antideficiency Act regarding Congressional approval of agency funding, in which initial opinion on the subject had been that this did not require a government agency to be closed down in the wake of the expiration of their funding, before Attorney General Benjamin Civiletti overruled this opinion with his own on 25 April 1980, stating that a provision of this act stipulated to the contrary. Five days later, the FTC was shutdown after Congress delayed funding for the agency in order to seek approval for an authorization bill to limit the agency's investigative and rule-making abilities following criticism of the FTC's aggressive monitoring of the economy.

The 1980 shutdown was the first time a federal agency shut down due to a budget dispute, with around 1,600 federal workers for the FTC being furloughed as a result, and Federal Marshals deployed to some FTC facilities to enforce their closure. The shutdown ended after one day when Carter threatened to close down the entire US government if Congress did not pass spending bills by 1 October later that year, with economists of the time estimating that the 1-day shutdown of the FTC cost the government around $700,000, the majority of which was towards back pay for the furloughed workers. In the aftermath of the shutdown, Civiletti issued a revised edition of his original opinion on 18 January 1981, detailing that shutdowns would still require agencies that protect human safety or property to continue operating if funding for them expired.

1981, 1984, and 1986 

In 1981, 1984, and 1986, thousands of federal employees were furloughed for a period of between 12 and 24 hours during both presidential terms of Ronald Reagan. The deadlocks focused on disagreements by Reagan towards Congressional bills that went against his political beliefs and goals. The first shutdown took place on 23 November 1981, lasting for a day and placing 241,000 federal employees into furlough, after Reagan vetoed a proposed appropriation bill that contained a reduced set of spending cuts than he had proposed for select government departments. While the shutdown affected only a number of government departments, economists of the time believed that it cost taxpayers an estimated $80–90 million in back pay and other expenses over the entire day.

The second shutdown occurred on the afternoon of 4 October 1984, with 500,000 federal employees placed on furlough during this period, after Reagan mounted opposition towards the inclusion of a water projects package and a civil rights measure within the proposed appropriations bill that day. While the shutdown covered around nine of the 13 appropriations bills that had not been passed at that point, Congress was forced to remove both of the opposed elements of the bill and include funding of the Nicaraguan Contras as a compromise to end the shutdown, with economists believing that the short period cost taxpayers an estimated $65 million in backpay.

The third shutdown took place over a similar period and furloughed the same number of federal employees on 17 October 1986. Economists estimated that this period cost the US government $62 million in lost work.  All government agencies were affected by this shutdown.

1990 

The shutdown of 1990 occurred during the presidential term of George H. W. Bush and focused on a disagreement over several measures he proposed for the 1991 appropriations bill - the inclusion of major tax increases, despite Bush's campaign promise against any new taxes, and major cuts in spending towards benefit programs, including Medicare, to combat deficit reduction. On 5 October 1990, liberal Democrats and conservative Republicans, led by then House Minority Whip Newt Gingrich, opposed the initial appropriations package, with Bush vetoing the second resolution to the spending bill the following day on 6 October.

The shutdown lasted until 9 October, when Bush agreed to remove his proposed tax increases and reduce the amount of spending cuts, in return for Congress providing a concession on the amended bill to allow for increasing income tax on the wealthy. The effects of the deadlock were lessened due to the fact that the shutdown occurred across the Columbus Day weekend - 6 October to 8 October. Only 2,800 workers were furloughed over this period, with national parks and museums, such as the Smithsonian, being closed, and a handful of departments unable to function, with the cost to the government for lost revenue and back wages being estimated to around $2.57 million.

1995–1996 

Between 1995 and 1996, the US government faced two shutdowns during the presidential term of Bill Clinton, who opposed proposed appropriation bills for 1996 by congressional Republicans (who had a majority in both chambers) and House Speaker Newt Gingrich. Both Gingrich and the majority of Congress sought to pass bills that would reduce government spending, much against Clinton's political objectives for 1996. Clinton objected to funding cuts affecting education, the environment, and public health. One proposed bill threatened to block a scheduled reduction he had planned towards premiums within Medicare. Both sides had differing opinions over the impact the proposed House bills would have over economic growth, medical inflation, and anticipated revenues, with Clinton vetoing the bills over amendments added to them by congressional Republicans, despite Gingrich threatening to refuse to raise the country's debt ceiling.

The first shutdown took place on 14 November 1995, after a CR issued on 1 October had expired, and meetings between Democrat and Republican leaders failed to end the deadlock. The effect of the deadlock led to the majority of government departments being closed down and 800,000 federal workers being furloughed as a result. Although the shutdown ended five days later on 19 November, the political friction between Clinton and Gingrich over the US budget remained unresolved, and on 16 December 1995, after further spending bills failed to secure approval, a second shutdown took place. Although lasting 21 days, fewer departments were closed down, and around 284,000 federal workers were furloughed during this period. The shutdown was eventually ended on 6 January 1996, when White House and Congressional negotiators worked out a balanced budget agreement, which included approval towards modest spending cuts and tax increases.

Both shutdowns had a contrasting impact on the major political players in the deadlock. Gingrich's political career was negatively impacted by the shutdowns, in part due to a comment he made during the deadlock that made it sound like his reasons for it were petty. Clinton's presidential term was positively improved by the shutdown and cited as part of the reason behind his successful re-election to the White House in 1996.

Some effects of the shutdowns included the government, tourism, and airline industry losing millions of dollars in revenue during this period, with disruptions made towards the processing of passports and visas, and work on medical research and toxic waste cleanup being halted.

2013 

The shutdown of 2013 occurred during the second Obama term, focusing on a disagreement between Republican-led House of Representatives and the Democratic-led Senate towards the contents of the 2014 Continuing Appropriations Resolution bill, alongside other political issues. Congressional Republicans, encouraged by conservative senators such as Ted Cruz, and conservative groups such as Heritage Action, sought to include several measures to the bill in late 2013 that could delay funding for the 2013 Affordable Care Act (ACA) and thus allow time for changes to be made to the act. However, both Obama and Democratic senators refused to agree to these measures, seeking instead for the bill to maintain government funding at then-current sequestration levels with no additional conditions.

The shutdown took place on 1 October 2013, as a result of an impasse over the contents of the bill, with the House unable to approve any CRs before this date. Democrats opposed further efforts by congressional Republicans, led by House Speaker John Boehner, to delay funding of the ACA, and rejected piecemeal Resolution bills proposed by them to resolve the shutdown. As Congress was at an impasse amidst rising concerns that the US would default on public debt, US senators - particularly then Senate Minority Leader Mitch McConnell and then Senate Majority Leader Harry Reid - negotiated a deal to end the deadlock. Their proposal, which won a Senate vote, approved an amended Resolution bill that would keep funding at sequestration levels, temporarily suspend the debt limit until 7 February 2014, and include a concession to congressional Republicans on the ACA by applying stricter income verification rules in regards to health insurance. Boehner eventually withdrew further objections and delaying attempts against the ACA upon the country being within hours of breaking its debt limit on 16 October 2013, with Congress approving the bill for Obama's signature the following day.

The 16-day shutdown had considerable impact upon the United States: approximately 800,000 federal employees were put on furlough, while an additional 1.3 million had to report to work without any known payment dates during this period, costing the government millions in back pay; major government programmes concerning Native Americans, children, and domestic violence victims, alongside the legal processing of asylum and immigration cases, and sexual assault cases handled by the Office of Civil Rights, were badly disrupted by the shutdown; tourism was greatly impacted due to the closure of national parks and institutions during the shutdown and cost the government millions in lost revenue; and US economic growth was reduced during this period. In political circles, the shutdown had a negative impact on Republicans, as over half of Americans held Republicans accountable for the deadlock, in comparison to public opinion on the accountability of both the Democrats and Obama during this period.

January 2018 

The shutdown of January 2018 was the first to occur during the presidential term of Donald Trump and was centered around a disagreement on the issue of immigration. By the start of October 2017, Congress had failed to approve an appropriation bill to fund the US government in 2018, and instead passed three CRs to keep federal agencies open until 19 January 2018. The failure to establish a permanent spending bill was due to Democratic senators insisting that any proposed House bill needed to include funding for the Deferred Action for Childhood Arrivals (DACA) immigration policy and assurances against deportation for immigrants that fell under the DREAM Act. Republicans refused to pass such bills, citing that discussions on immigration and those individuals under DACA would not be held until mid-March of the following year. A senate vote to extend the 2018 Continuing Appropriations Resolution on 19 January 2018, which had passed a congressional vote the previous day, failed to achieve a majority, after Democratic senators led a filibuster aimed at forcing Republicans to invoke a shorter duration of CR and thus invoke negotiations that could lead to extensions of the DACA policy. but failed to achieve a majority, as Democrats sought a shorter duration of CAR to force negotiations.

The shutdown took place on 20 January 2018, and led to approximately 692,000 federal workers being furloughed. An attempt by Democrats to protect the payment of military personnel during the deadlock was rejected by Republicans, after  Senate Majority Leader Mitch McConnell stated that funding had to be restored for the entire US government rather than for individual government branches. Despite the bill's failure, both sides engaged in negotiations that eventually culminated with a deal on a proposed stopgap measure to fund the government for four weeks - as part of the proposal, Democrats agreed to end their filibuster and approve the Republican's measure, in exchange for fresh talks on the DACA policy and DREAM Act within newly proposed Resolution bill. The measure was approved in the House and passed a Senate vote, effectively ending the shutdown on 23 January.

The impact of the shutdown was not as severe as in previous deadlocks - most government departments, such as the Department of Energy and the Environmental Protection Agency, were able to continue their functions during the 3-day deadlock despite their workers needing back-pay in the aftermath, and only a third of National Parks in the United States were closed down. In the aftermath of the shutdown, the Senate debated on a bill for the 2018 Bipartisan Budget Act to provide 2-year funding for the military, and provide an extension to the Resolution to keep the government funded for another six weeks. However, the negotiations suffered delays that triggered the brief 9 February spending gap, though this merely lasted for nine hours, causing little disruption.

December 2018–January 2019 

The shutdown of December 2018–January 2019 was the second to occur during the presidential term of Donald Trump, and was due to a disagreement over negotiations for Trump's wall along the Mexico–United States border. Trump sought to have the appropriation bill for 2019 include a funding measure on border security, providing $5.7 billion toward construction of the wall. Democrats refused to support the bill, citing that the funding would be a waste of taxpayer money and questioned the effectiveness the new wall would have, opting to propose bills that would include funding for border security, but towards improving pre-existing security measures. Trump initially backed down on demands for border wall funding, but reversed this decision on 20 December 2018 over pressure from supporters, refusing to sign any CRs that did not include it.

The shutdown began on 22 December 2018, after Democrats refused to support a new CR  in the Senate that included approximately $5 billion for the new border wall, and continued to block further attempts upon taking control of Congress on 3 January 2019 following the 2018 mid-term elections. Although he had support from several Republicans, including Senate Majority Leader Mitch McConnell, Trump faced stiff opposition to border wall funding from House Speaker Nancy Pelosi and Senate Minority Leader Chuck Schumer, with neither party able to break the political impasse through negotiations, rallying public support through televised addresses, offering proposals on alternative border security funding measures, or making concessions for a proposed appropriation bill with regards to the DACA policy. The deadlock eventually ended on 25 January 2019, when both chambers of Congress approved a plan to reopen the US government for 3 weeks, in order to facilitate a period of negotiations to determine a suitable appropriation bill that both parties could agree upon, with Trump endorsing the deal amidst rising security and safety concerns.

The 35-day shutdown, the longest in US history after surpassing the 21-day shutdown of 1995–1996, led to 380,000 federal workers being furloughed, and an additional 420,000 workers were required to work without any known payment dates during this period, forcing many to find other paid work or protest against the extended period of the deadlock. The extent of the funding gap had further major impacts - sharp reductions had to be made on SNAP payments, and the Internal Revenue Service faced extensive delays on processing tax refunds worth around $140 billion; a lack of resources due to the funding gap impacted the work of several agencies, with the FBI facing major disruptions that risked compromising a number of investigations being conducted at the time; staff shortages in the Transportation Security Administration caused a number of airports to be closed down as a result; and economic growth was severely reduced by billions of dollars.

According to the Congressional Budget Office, the shutdown cost the government $3 billion in back pay for furloughed workers, plus $2 billion in lost tax revenues due to reduced tax evasion compliance activities by the Internal Revenue Service, and a smaller amount of lost fees such as for visits to national parks, for a total of about $5 billion.

State and territorial governments

County governments

See also 

 Loss of supply
 Budget crisis
 Deficit spending
 Cabinet crisis
 Constitutional crisis
 Gridlock (politics)
 Fiscal policy
 Generational accounting
 Lockout

U.S. 
 Deficit hawk
 Taxation in the United States
 Fiscal policy of the United States
 National debt by U.S. presidential terms
 Starve the beast
 United States federal budget
 National debt of the United States
 Appropriations bill (United States)

References

External links 
 Congressional Research Service: Shutdown of the Federal Government: Causes, Processes, and Effects

 
Government finances in the United States